Liyunqucha (Quechua liyun lion (a borrowing from Spanish león, here referring to the cougar), qucha lake, "cougar's (or lion's) lake", also spelled León Cocha) is a   mountain in the Andes of Peru. It is located in the Junín Region, Yauli Province, Marcapomacocha District, and in the Lima Region, Huarochirí Province, Carampoma District. Liyunqucha lies northwest of Yana Ulla and southeast of a mountain named Lichiqucha.

References

Mountains of Peru
Mountains of Lima Region
Mountains of Junín Region